Club Bowie is a 2003 compilation of material by David Bowie. It includes non-contemporary club mixes of Bowie hits, despite the "rare and unreleased" claim on the cover.

Track listing 
 "Loving the Alien" - (The Scumfrog vs. David Bowie) (David Bowie) – 8:21
 "Let's Dance" - (Trifactor vs. Deeper Substance remix) (Bowie) – 11:02
 "Just for One Day" (""Heroes"") - (David Guetta vs. Bowie) (Bowie, Brian Eno, David Guetta) – 6:37
 "This Is Not America" - (The Scumfrog vs. David Bowie) (Bowie, Lyle Mays, Pat Metheny) – 9:12
 "Shout" ("Fashion") - (Solaris vs. Bowie) (Bowie) – 8:02
 "China Girl" - (Riff & Vox Club mix) (Bowie, Iggy Pop) – 7:08
 "Magic Dance" (Danny S Magic Party remix) (Bowie) – 7:39
 "Let's Dance" - (Club Bolly extended mix) (Bowie, Anita Kaur, Navin Kumar Singh) – 7:56
 "Let's Dance" - (Club Bolly mix) (Video) (Bowie, Kaur, Singh) – 3:52
 Enhanced Video

Personnel 
 Tim Binns – Project Coordinator
 Karen Cai – Video Director
 Deeper Substance – Remixing
 Ben Galvin – Remixing
 Shawn Letts – Remixing
 The Scumfrog – Remixing
 Daniel Shepherd – Programming, Producer
 Kelvin Singh – Remixing
 Solaris – Producer, Remixing
 Trifactor – Remixing
 Henry Wrenn Meleck – Project Coordinator

References 

David Bowie compilation albums
2003 compilation albums
2003 remix albums
Virgin Records compilation albums
Virgin Records remix albums
EMI Records compilation albums